"Mein Herz brennt" (German for "My heart burns") is a song by German Neue Deutsche Härte band Rammstein. The song first appeared as the opening track to the band's third studio album, Mutter (2001), and was used as the opening track for concerts during that era. It also appeared on the band's greatest hits album Made in Germany 1995–2011 (2011), being the only song on the album that, at the time of release, had not been released as a single or had a music video. The song was released as a single in 2012 to promote the then-upcoming video collection Videos 1995–2012. A piano version of the song was released as a single on 7 December 2012.

The song's lyrics involve a narrator describing the terrors of nightmares. The opening line of the song's intro and chorus (Nun, liebe Kinder, gebt fein Acht. Ich habe euch etwas mitgebracht, meaning "Now, dear children, pay attention. I have brought something for you") is taken from the German children's TV show Sandmännchen ("Mr Sandman"), which provided children with a bedtime story. The song's narrator appears as a darker version of the character.

Music videos 
Two separate videos were produced for "Mein Herz brennt", one for the original version and another for the piano version. Both were filmed in the main bathroom of Beelitz-Heilstätten, and were directed by Zoran Bihać, who had previously directed the video for "Links 2-3-4", then later on directed the videos for "Mein Teil" and "Rosenrot". Bihać described the relationship between the two videos as 'yin and yang', with the piano version being the latter.

Piano version 
The music video for the piano version of the song premiered on 7 December 2012 on Vimeo. The video shows lead singer Till Lindemann wearing a black dress and fishnets, while also sporting black and white face paint. The entire bathroom is light red, and in the centre is a 'T' shaped pool emitting light. The video consists of close-ups on Lindemann singing from behind the pool, until the second verse begins, where he begins to walk to the pool's foot. As the song closes, Lindemann walks into it and its light fades. The music video for the piano version is the first video since "Mutter" to show only Lindemann.

Original version
The video for the original version was released on 14 December 2012. In this video, the character of the Sandman is played by Melanie Gaydos. She first appears to a sleeping Richard Kruspe, triggering nightmares and sending him into a state of agony. Meanwhile, Till terrorizes the complex of Beelitz-Heilstätten, which acts as an orphanage. He kidnaps the orphans and places them in a cage located in the main bathroom. A female warden attempts to defend the children with a shotgun, but Till overpowers her. The warden appears in the video both young (Viktorija Bojarskaja) and old (Anna von Rüden), while Till remains the same age, indicating immortality and paranormal abilities.

While guarding the orphans, Till takes a grotesque, insect-like form with an elongated head and fingers. The children are then used in various examinations and surgeries with the rest of the band playing the doctors. The female warden is also seen assisting them in her younger form. One of the surgeries sees a child's tears extracted through a syringe, which is then vaginally injected into herself by the Sandman. The Sandman is also subject to examinations by the doctors, as Paul H. Landers is seen giving her a gynecological examination.

She later walks in a dress shielding two small children, possibly indicating that the tears are involved in a form of In vitro fertilisation. While Till is away from the main bathroom, the children (portrayed by the rest of the band as disheveled adults) escape from their cage and the orphanage. This causes Till to tear out and consume his own heart while the Heilstätten is engulfed in an inferno. The video ends with the liberated walking away from the building, while the chorus of the piano version plays in the background, signalling the video of the piano version as an afterword.

Track listing

CD-Maxi 
 "Mein Herz brennt (Piano Version)" ("My Heart burns") – 4:31
 "Gib mir deine Augen" ("Give me your eyes") – 3:44
 "Mein Herz brennt (Video Edit)" ("My Heart burns") – 4:18
 "Mein Herz brennt (Boys Noize RMX) ("My Heart burns") – 5:00
 "Mein Herz brennt (Piano Instrumental)" ("My Heart burns") – 4:31

iTunes exclusive edition 
 "Mein Herz brennt (Piano Version)" ("My Heart burns") – 4:31
 "Gib mir deine Augen" ("Give me your eyes") – 3:44
 "Mein Herz brennt (Video Edit)" ("My Heart burns") – 4:18
 "Mein Herz brennt (Boys Noize RMX)" ("My Heart burns") – 5:00
 "Mein Herz brennt (Piano Instrumental)" ("My Heart burns") – 4:31
 "Mein Herz brennt (Turntablerocker RMX)" ("My Heart burns") – 5:23

7" vinyl 
 "Mein Herz brennt (Piano Version)" ("My Heart burns") – 4:31
 "Gib mir deine Augen" ("Give me your eyes") – 3:44

(source:)

Release history 
 7 December 2012 – Germany, Austria, Finland, Sweden, iTunes (international)
 10 December 2012 – France, UK
 11 December 2012 – Spain, US, Canada

(source:)

Charts

In popular culture 
The song plays a prominent role in the opening scene of Lukas Moodysson's acclaimed 2002 film Lilya 4-ever, in which the title character is depicted in media res, bruised and beaten.

References 

2012 singles
Rammstein songs
2000 songs
Symphonic metal songs
Universal Records singles
Songs written by Richard Z. Kruspe
Songs written by Paul Landers
Songs written by Till Lindemann
Songs written by Christian Lorenz
Songs written by Oliver Riedel
Songs written by Christoph Schneider